The 2022 season was Kuching City's seventh year in existence and their third season in the Malaysia Premier League, second tier of Malaysian football. The club also participated in the Malaysia FA Cup and Malaysia Cup.

Events
Hidhir Idris joined the club on loan from Kedah Darul Aman. Shafizi Iqmal dan Wan Muhammad Faiz also joined the club with one-year contract.

The club signed three new foreign players Yuki Tanigawa, Abu Kamara and Keanu Marsh-Brown for the 2022 season.

Players

First-team squad

Transfers in

Transfers out

Competitions

Malaysia Premier League

Malaysia FA Cup

Malaysia Cup

Knockout stage

Squad statistics

Appearances and goals

Players listed with no appearances have been in the matchday squad but only as unused substitutes.

|-
! colspan=14 style=background:#dcdcdc; text-align:center| Goalkeepers

|-
! colspan=14 style=background:#dcdcdc; text-align:center| Defenders

|-
! colspan=14 style=background:#dcdcdc; text-align:center| Midfielders

|-
! colspan=14 style=background:#dcdcdc; text-align:center| Forwards

|-
! colspan=14 style=background:#dcdcdc; text-align:center|Left the club during the Season

|-

References

Kuching City
Kuching City F.C.
2022